The Stand, published from 2008 to 2012, was a series of comic books by Marvel Comics based on Stephen King's 1978 novel of the same name. Based on the 1990 Complete & Uncut version of the novel, the comic adaptation was written by Roberto Aguirre-Sacasa with art by Mike Perkins and Laura Martin. Its thirty-one issues, divided into six story arcs, completed the telling of the unabridged novel. Stephen King served as Creative and Executive Director of the project.

On March 11, 2009, Marvel began publishing collections for each story arc, and on September 19, 2012, it published a hardcover omnibus edition collecting the adaptation in its entirety, with bonus materials not contained in the original releases.

Story arcs

Companion releases

Collections

Story arc collections

Omnibus collections

See also
The Dark Tower (comics)

External links
Official Stephen King comics page

The Stand
2008 comics debuts
 
Marvel Comics graphic novels